Javier Güémez López (born 17 October 1991) is a Mexican professional footballer who plays as a defensive midfielder for Liga MX club Atlético San Luis.

Club career

Youth career
Güémez first joined Dorados youth academy in 2007. Continuing through Dorados de Sinoloa Youth Academy successfully going through Dorados de Sinaloa Premier. Until finally reaching the first team, Francisco Palacios Tamayo being the coach promoting Güémez to first team.

Dorados De Sinaloa
Born in Culiacán, Sinaloa, Güémez began his career with local club Dorados in 2010. On August 1, 2010, Güémez made his Ascenso MX debut against La Piedad ending in a 2–1 loss. He played a total of 66 league matches for the club.

Club Tijuana
Güémez was then transferred to Club Tijuana in 2013. On August 9, 2013, Güémez made his competitive Liga MX debut against UNAM ending in a 2–0 win.

Club América
On 5 June 2015, Güémez was announced as the new signing for Club América for the Apertura 2015 campaign.

Querétaro
On 6 June 2017 Querétaro officially signed Güémez. Güémez made his debut appearance with the club on July 22, 2017, against his former team Club América which ended in a 1–0 win.

Toluca
On 20 December 2019, it was announced that Güémez would join Toluca for the Clausura 2020 tournament.

International career
On 1 October 2014, Güémez was called to the senior national team for friendlies against Honduras and Panama.

On 5 October 2015, Güémez was called to replace Giovani dos Santos for the 2015 CONCACAF Cup squad.

Career statistics

International

Honours
América
CONCACAF Champions League: 2015–16

Mexico
CONCACAF Cup: 2015

References

External links

 
 

1991 births
Living people
Association football midfielders
Dorados de Sinaloa footballers
Club Tijuana footballers
Club América footballers
Querétaro F.C. footballers
Deportivo Toluca F.C. players
Atlético San Luis footballers
Liga MX players
Mexico international footballers
Footballers from Sinaloa
Sportspeople from Culiacán
2015 Copa América players
21st-century Mexican people
Mexican footballers